The 1988 Norwegian Football Cup Final was the final match of the 1988 Norwegian Football Cup, the 83rd season of the Norwegian Football Cup, the premier Norwegian football cup competition organized by the Football Association of Norway (NFF). The final was played at the Ullevaal Stadion in Oslo, and opposed two First Division sides Rosenborg and Brann. As the inaugural final match finished 2–2, the final was replayed seven days later at the same venue with the Rosenborg defeated Brann 2–0 to claim the Norwegian Cup for a fourth time in their history.

Matches

First match details

Replay match details

References

1988
Football Cup
Rosenborg BK matches
SK Brann matches
1980s in Oslo
Sports competitions in Oslo
Norwegian Football Cup Final